Dromius agilis is a species of ground beetle endemic to the Palearctic (including Europe). In Europe, it is found in Austria, the Balearic Islands (doubtful), Belarus, Belgium, Bosnia and Herzegovina, Bulgaria, Croatia, the Czech Republic, mainland Denmark, Estonia, Finland, mainland France, Germany, Great Britain including the Isle of Man, mainland Greece, Hungary, the Republic of Ireland, mainland Italy, Kaliningrad, Latvia, Liechtenstein, Lithuania, Luxembourg, Moldova, Northern Ireland, North Macedonia, mainland Norway, Poland, Russia, Slovakia, Slovenia, mainland Spain, Sweden, Switzerland, the Netherlands, Ukraine, and Yugoslavia.

References

Lebiinae
Beetles described in 1787